is a passenger railway station located in the city of Iruma, Saitama, Japan, operated by the private railway operator Seibu Railway.

Lines

Station layout
The station consists of a ground-level island platform serving two tracks. The station building and entrance is situated on the north side and is connected to the platform by a footbridge.

Platforms

History
The station opened on 3 April 1926.

Station numbering was introduced on all Seibu Railway lines during fiscal 2012, with Motokaji Station becoming "SI25".

Passenger statistics
In fiscal 2019, the station was the least used station on the Ikebukuro-Hannō section of the Seibu Ikebukuro Line (76th out of 92 on the Seibu network as a whole) with an average of 7,035 passengers daily. The passenger figures for previous years are as shown below.

Surrounding area
 Surugadai University

See also
 List of railway stations in Japan

References

External links

 Station information (Seibu Railway) 
 Motokaji Station information (Saitama Prefectural Government) 

Railway stations in Saitama Prefecture
Railway stations in Japan opened in 1926
Seibu Ikebukuro Line
Iruma, Saitama